This is a list of devices using Qualcomm Snapdragon processors. Snapdragon is a family of mobile system on a chip (SoC) made by Qualcomm for use in smartphones, tablets, and smartbook devices.

Snapdragon S1

Snapdragon S2

Snapdragon S3

Snapdragon S4 series

Snapdragon S4 Play

Snapdragon S4 Plus

Snapdragon S4 Pro

Snapdragon 2 series

Snapdragon 200 (2013)

Qualcomm 205, Snapdragon 208, 210 and 212 (2014-17)

Qualcomm 215 (2019)

Snapdragon 4 series

Snapdragon 400 (2013)

Snapdragon 410, 412 and 415 (2014/15)

Snapdragon 425, 427, 430 and 435 (2015/16)

Snapdragon 429, 439 and 450 (2017/18)

Snapdragon 460 (2020)

Snapdragon 480/480+ 5G (2021)

Snapdragon 4 Gen 1 (2022)

Snapdragon 6 series

Snapdragon 600 (2013)

Snapdragon 610, 615 and 616 (2014/15)

Snapdragon 617, 625 and 626 (2015/16)

Snapdragon 650 (618), 652 (620) and 653 (2015/16)

Snapdragon 630, 636 and 660 (2017)

Snapdragon 632 and 670 (2018)

Snapdragon 662, 665, 675 and 678 (2019/20)

Snapdragon 680 4G, 690 5G and 695 5G (2020/21)

Snapdragon 7 series

Snapdragon 710 and 712 (2018/19)

Snapdragon 720G and 730/730G/732G (2019/20)

Snapdragon 750G and 765/765G/768G 5G (2020)

Snapdragon 778G/778G+, 780G and 782G 5G (2021/22)

Snapdragon 7 Gen 1 (2022)

Snapdragon 8 series

Snapdragon 800, 801 and 805 (2013/14)

Snapdragon 808 and 810 (2015)

Snapdragon 820 and 821 (2016)

Snapdragon 835 (2017)

Snapdragon 845 (2018)

Snapdragon 855/855+ (2019) and 860 (2021)

Snapdragon 865/865+ 5G (2020) and 870 5G (2021)

Snapdragon 888/888+ 5G (2021)

Snapdragon 8/8+ Gen 1 (2022)

Snapdragon 8 Gen 2 (2023)

Mobile Compute Platforms

Snapdragon 835 and 850, 7c/7c+, 8c and 8cx

Microsoft SQ1, SQ2 and SQ3

See also
 List of Qualcomm Snapdragon systems on chips

References

External links 
 , product page

Qualcomm
ARM-based systems on chips
Lists of computer hardware
System on a chip